Rafael Nadal defeated Gastón Gaudio in the final, 6–3, 6–3, 6–4 to win the singles tennis title at the 2005 Stuttgart Open.

Guillermo Cañas was the reigning champion, but did not participate this year.

Seeds

Draws

Key
Q - Qualifier
WC - Wild Card
r - Retired
LL - Lucky loser
w/o - Walkover

Finals

Top half

Section 1

Section 2

Bottom half

Section 3

Section 4

External links
 Main draw
 Qualifying draw

Singles 2005
Stuttgart Singles